Vadivel Puththirasigamoney (born 10 October 1951) is a Sri Lankan politician and a former member of the Parliament of Sri Lanka.

Educated  at Holy Trinity College, Commercial College and Administrative Staff College in India . ILO/Un Staff College Torino, Italy (Followed Diploma in Strategic use of IT. Have special diploma in Industrial Law.

Deputy Minister of Justice and Law Reforms 2007-2010

References

1951 births
Living people
Sri Lankan Tamil politicians
Sri Lankan Hindus
Members of the 13th Parliament of Sri Lanka
United People's Freedom Alliance politicians
Sri Lankan expatriates in India